Eberhard Schlotter (June 3, 1921 – September 8, 2014) worked as an international painter in Spain and Germany. He is the brother of the sculptor Gotthelf Schlotter (1922–2007).

Schlotter was born in Hildesheim, eldest son of the sculptor Heinrich Schlotter, was private at the Second World War, studying later on in Munich. In 1955, he made acquaintance with Arno Schmidt - which resulted in many pictures of the famous novelist and the village he lived in, Bargfeld. He died in 2014 at Altea, Alicante, Spain.

Further reading 
 Heidi Roch-Stübler/Günther Flemming: Eberhard Schlotter. Malerei 1941-1986, Darmstadt 1987.
 Eberhard Schlotter und Arno Schmidt. Viele gemEinsame Wege, Hildesheim 1989.

References

External links
 http://www.celle.de/showobject.phtml?&object=tx%7C342.739.1 - Eberhard-Schlotter-Stiftung Celle (Eberhard Schlotter Foundation in Celle)
Obras digitalizadas de Eberhard Schlotter en la Biblioteca Digital Hispánica de la Biblioteca Nacional de España

20th-century German painters
20th-century German male artists
German male painters
21st-century German painters
21st-century German male artists
1921 births
2014 deaths
People from Hildesheim
People from the Province of Saxony
German Army soldiers of World War II
German expatriates in Spain